Morrisia is a genus of beetle in the family Cerambycidae. It was described by Santos-Silva, Nascimento & Wappes in 2019. The name is a permanently unavailable junior homonym of Morrisia Davidson, 1852 and will need to be replaced.

Species
Morrisia pulchra Santos-Silva, Nascimento & Wappes, 2019
Morrisia squamosa (Chemsak & Noguera, 1993)

References

Apomecynini
Cerambycidae genera